Stephan Lerch (born 10 August 1984) is a German football coach who was most recently the manager of Frauen-Bundesliga club VfL Wolfsburg.

Coaching career
Lerch's first manager job, were at his former club FC Alsbach in 2012, were he also played from 2004 to 2010.

Lerch joined VfL Wolfsburg second team, where he was the team's head coach for two season, until he became assistant coach for the clubs first team in the summer 2015.

In April 2017, he replaced his coach colleague German Ralf Kellermann as new head coach for VfL Wolfsburg. Kellermann were the team's head coach for about 9 years until he became the new sporting director for the women's team. Since his election as new head coach, he qualified the team for the 2018 UEFA Women's Champions League Final in Kyiv. Wolfsburg was defeated 1–4 by Lyon. He has won the national league Frauen-Bundesliga and DFB-Pokal every year since his election in 2017.

Coaching honors

VfL Wolfsburg
UEFA Women's Champions League:
Runners-up (1): 2019–20
Frauen-Bundesliga:
Winners (5): 2016-17, 2017–18, 2018–19, 2019–20
Runners-up (2): 2015-16
DFB Pokal:
 Winners (6): 2015–16, 2016–17, 2017–18, 2018–19, 2019–20

References

External links
 
 
 Profile at VfL Wolfsburg

1984 births
Living people
Sportspeople from Darmstadt
Association football midfielders
German footballers
German football managers
VfL Wolfsburg (women) managers